Hannah Elizabeth may refer to:

Hannah Elizabeth (ship)
Hannah Elizabeth (Love Island)